Joseba Arregui Aramburu (30 May 1946 – 14 September 2021) was a Spanish politician, theologian, and academic.

Biography
Aramburu was born in Andoain on 30 May 1946. He studied at the Seminario Diocesano de San Sebastián and was ordained a priest. He then travelled to Fribourg to study theology and teaching and later earned a doctorate in theology from the University of Münster. He returned to Spain and finished his studies, earning a doctorate in sociology from the University of Deusto. He became a professor of sociology at the University of the Basque Country until his retirement in 2011.

Aramburu became a prominent member of the Basque Nationalist Party (EAJ) and resistant to the Franco dictatorship. He served as Minister of Culture of the Basque Government multiple times under the leadership of José Antonio Ardanza and was a member of the Basque Parliament from 1999 to 2001, representing Gipuzkoa. He retired from political activity in 2001 and left the EAJ in 2004 due to disagreements within the party. That year, he co-founded "Aldaketa", which promoted political change in the Basque Country and defended the Statute of Autonomy of the Basque Country of 1979.

Aramburu became the author of multiple books, such as La nación vasca posible, Euskadi invertebrada, and El terror de ETA: la narrativa de las víctimas.

Joseba Arregui Aramburu died on 14 September 2021 at the age of 75.

References

1946 births
2021 deaths
Basque politicians
Spanish theologians
Government ministers of the Basque Country (autonomous community)
Members of the 7th Basque Parliament
Basque Nationalist Party politicians
University of Münster alumni
University of Deusto alumni
Academic staff of the University of the Basque Country
People from Andoain